SS Ralph A. Cram was an American Liberty ship built in 1943 for service in World War II. Her namesake was Ralph Adams Cram, an influential American architect of collegiate and ecclesiastical buildings. She was operated by Smith-Johnson Steamship Corporation under  charter with the Maritime Commission and War Shipping Administration.

Design 

Most Liberty ships were named after prominent deceased Americans.

Construction and career 
This particular ship was built by California Shipbuilding Corporation in Los Angeles. She was completed and commissioned in 1943.

After the war, she was sold to commercial service and renamed Atlantico in 1947.

Later again sold to Polish Steamship Company in 1963 and renamed Huta Ostroviec.

She was scrapped in 1973.

References

 

Liberty ships
Ships built in California
1943 ships